France participated in the Eurovision Song Contest 1970 with the song "Marie-Blanche" performed by Guy Bonnet. The song was chosen through a seven-week televised show titled Musicolor. "Marie-Blanche" came in fourth place out of twelve, and received eight points at the contest.

Before Eurovision

National final
For 1970, after eight years of internal selections, France's national broadcaster, Office de Radiodiffusion Télévision Française (ORTF), organized a televised national final which lasted seven weeks. A professional jury chose 16 out of the 143 songs submitted to go to the Saturday evening music show titled Musicolor which would choose the entrant for 1970. Musicolor consisted of four quarter-finals, two semi-finals, and a final with shows taking place each Saturday. Four songs were performed each week and were voted on by various juries representing the regional stations of ORTF. The juries could qualify one song to go to the next round.

By the fifth and sixth Saturdays, the juries had selected four songs to participate in the two semi-finals, with semi consisting of two songs. The winner of each semi-final went to the final round which was held on February 21, 1970 and hosted by Dany Danielle and Sylvain Deschamps. At the final, Guy Bonnet won with "Marie-Blanche" over Daniel Beretta and Isabelle Aubret's "Olivier, Olivia".

At Eurovision
Guy Bonnet performed "Marie-Blanche" sixth on the night, before the United Kingdom's Mary Hopkin with "Knock Knock, Who's There?", and following Belgium's Jean Vallée with "Viens l'oublier". At the close of voting, the song received eight points: three from Ireland, two from Monaco and Yugoslavia, and one from Italy, placing it fourth out of the twelve entrants. Each country had a jury of ten who gave one point to their favorite song.

Voting

References 

1970
Countries in the Eurovision Song Contest 1970
Eurovision